RAIZ is an Aruban political party. The party was founded on June 9, 2017, by Tai-Foo Lee and Ursell Arends, who is also the party leader. Raiz is a middle-class party with a progressive, social-democratic slant. It aims to distinguish itself from the traditional parties through innovative campaign and political culture. The party's spearheads are public finances and transparency of governance.

Participation in elections 
RAIZ debuted in the state elections of 2017 and was the first Aruban political party to also present a calculation of its party program. With a list of five candidates, the party obtained 2107 votes, but was 82 votes short for a state seat. Between 2017 and 2021 it remained active as an extra-parliamentary party. RAIZ managed to secure two state seats in the 2021 elections and has since become the third largest party in Aruba with 5430 votes.

References

Political parties in Aruba
Political parties established in 2017